The following lists events that happened during 1838 in New Zealand.

Incumbents

Regal and viceregal
Head of State – Queen Victoria
Governor of New South Wales – Sir George Gipps, having been appointed on 5 October 1837, arrives in Sydney on 23 February.

Government and law
British Resident in New Zealand — James Busby

Events 
10 January
 — Bishop Jean Baptiste Pompallier arrives in New Zealand at Totara Point on the Hokianga Harbour.
 — Flax trader James Farrow purchases an acre of land at Otumoetai, Tauranga.
13 January – Bishop Pompallier celebrates the first Catholic mass on land in New Zealand at the home of Thomas and Mary Poynton at Totara Point.
February
 — The offer of a Royal charter to the New Zealand Association to take responsibility for the administration of New Zealand is withdrawn. (see 1837, December).
April
 — The French whaler Cachalot, commanded by Jean Langlois, arrives in New Zealand waters and commences whaling near the Chatham Islands.
May
 — The Cachalot arrives at Banks Peninsula accompanied by the French corvette Héroine.
2 August – Jean Langlois completes the purchase of Banks Peninsula from local Māori and makes a downpayment of goods to the value of 150 francs. Captain Cecille of the Héroine raises the French flag and proclaims French sovereignty over Banks Peninsula.
August
 — The New Zealand Association is wound up. In its place the New Zealand Colonisation Company and the New Zealand Land Company are established. (see also 1839)

Undated
The Reverend Alfred Nesbitt Brown re-opens the Anglican mission at Tauranga. (see also 1836 & 1837)
Three Gisborne Māori, having had Christian instruction in the Bay of Islands, return as catechists.

Births
 6 October (in Scotland): John McKenzie, politician. 
 (unknown date, in Yorkshire England): Henry Hirst, politician.

See also
List of years in New Zealand
Timeline of New Zealand history
History of New Zealand

References